Like all municipalities of Puerto Rico, San Lorenzo is subdivided into administrative units called barrios, which are roughly comparable to minor civil divisions, (and means wards or boroughs or neighborhoods in English). The barrios and subbarrios, in turn, are further subdivided into smaller local populated place areas/units called sectores (sectors in English). The types of sectores may vary, from normally sector to urbanización to reparto to barriada to residencial, among others. Some sectors appear in two barrios.

List of sectors by barrio

Cayaguas

	Camino Carlos Colón 
	Camino Esperanza Roldán 
	Camino Gamalier
	Camino Los Rivera 
	Camino Rivera 
	Sector Alverio 
	Sector Capilla 
	Sector Dávila 
	Sector La Represa 
	Sector Los Grillos 
	Sector Manchurria 
	Sector Morales 
	Sector Pablo Muñoz 
	Sector Piedras Blancas 
	Sector Rivera
	Sector Robles 
	Sector Teyo Rodríguez

Cerro Gordo

	Anexo Urbanización Jardines de Cerro Gordo 
	Camino Francisco Loiz 
	Camino Geño Rosario 
	Camino Juan Dulia 
	Camino Sueño Realizado 
	Camino Tensio Nieves 
	Condominio Alondra
	Residencial Villas de San Lorenzo 
	Sector Acueducto Abajo 
	Sector Almeda 
	Sector Alverio 
	Sector Bone Santa 
	Sector Campo Flores 
	Sector Carmelita Zayas 
	Sector Carrasquillo 
	Sector Fermín Santiago 
	Sector Hoyo Hondo 
	Sector Josefa Domínguez 
	Sector La Marina 
	Sector Laí 
	Sector Los Velázquez 
	Sector Miguel Sánchez 
	Sector Nato Dávila 
	Sector Orozco 
	Sector Pedro Power 
	Sector Piedra Gorda 
	Sector Roldán 
	Sector Rosado 
	Sector Tesoro Escondido 
	Sector Velázquez 
	Urbanización Alturas de San Lorenzo 
	Urbanización Bosque Llano 
	Urbanización Hacienda Cerro Gordo 
	Urbanización Jardines de Cerro Gordo 
	Urbanización Monte Rey
   Urbanización Paseos de las Flores

Espino

	Camino Los Dones 
	Parcelas Espino 
	Sector Benny Muñoz 
	Sector Campo Alegre 
	Sector Canta Gallo 
	Sector Capilla o Parroquia 
	Sector Chole Martínez 
	Sector El Flaco 
	Sector Felipe Colón 
	Sector Goyo Rosario 
	Sector Hilario Pérez
	Sector La Providencia 
	Sector La Quinta 
	Sector La Selecta 
	Sector Morena 
	Sector Nelson Rodríguez
	Sector Quebrada Lajas 
	Sector Villa Lili

Florida

	Camino Joaquín Corona 
	Camino Pedro Borges 
	Ramal 9929 
	Residencial Villas de San Lorenzo 
	Sector Acosta 
	Sector Artiri 
	Sector Arturo Hernández
	Sector Camino Viejo 
	Sector Cendito Torres 
	Sector Contreras (Carretera 183) 
	Sector Contreras (Carretera 9929) 
	Sector Cuatro Calles 
	Sector El Chaparral 
	Sector El Coco 
	Sector Fernández 
	Sector González 
	Sector Hacienda Mi Sueño 
	Sector Las Cumbres 
	Sector Los Amigos 
	Sector Los Astacio 
	Sector Los Calderón 
	Sector Los Flores
	Sector Los Gómez 
	Sector Los Mameyes 
	Sector Los Paganes 
	Sector Los Reyes 
	Sector Miguel Sánchez 
	Sector Montañez 
	Sector Pedraza 
	Sector Pérez 
	Sector Rafael Colón 
	Sector Terrazas de Florida 
	Sector Tito Morales 
	Sector Zarzal 
	Urbanización Alejandra Valley 
	Urbanización Ciudad Massó 
	Urbanización Florida Garden 
	Urbanización Hacienda Florida 
	Urbanización Los Flamboyanes

Hato

	Apartamentos Urbanización Valentina
	Camino Cholo Serrano 
	Camino Esperanza Ramos 
	Camino Julio Delgado 
	Camino Los Claudio 
	Extensión Tamarindos 
	Haciendas de San Lorenzo 
	Parcelas Hato 
	Residencial Lorenzana 
	Sector Buxó 
	Sector Cáez 
	Sector Capilla 
	Sector Carfeli 
	Sector Cuchilla 
	Sector Federico Delgado 
	Sector Hernández 
	Sector La Loma 
	Sector Los Adorno 
	Sector Montañez 
	Sector Muñoz 
	Sector Neris 
	Sector Oquendo 
	Sector Rosa 
	Sector Sánchez 
	Sector Santiago 
	Sector Solares Monzón 
	Sector Zavala 
	Tramo Carretera 183
	Urbanización Aponte y Sellés 
	Urbanización Camino de las Flores 
	Urbanización Carfeli 
	Urbanización El Parque (Santa Clara) 
	Urbanización Estancias de San Lorenzo (Ave. Mariano Olalla) 
	Urbanización Los Caminos 
	Urbanización Muñoz Marín 
	Urbanización Portal del Sol 
	Urbanización Ramos Antonini 
	Urbanización San Lorenzo 
	Urbanización San Lorenzo Valley 
	Urbanización Tamarindos 
	Urbanización Villas del Hato 
	Urbanización Vistas de San Lorenzo 
	Urbanización y Extensión Roosevelt

Jagual

	Carretera 181
	Comunidad Los Rosales 
	Parcelas Nuevas 
	Parcelas Viejas 
	Sector Acueducto
	Sector Badén 
	Sector Borges 
	Sector Cantera 
	Sector Capilla 
	Sector Carlos Flores 
	Sector El Cinco 
	Sector El Salto 
	Sector García 
	Sector Juan Flores
	Sector La Ceiba 
	Sector La Loma 
	Sector Los Díaz 
	Sector Los González 
	Sector Melilla 
	Sector Rabo del Buey 
	Sector Vázquez

Quebrada

	Colonia Vapor 
	Entrada Crematorio 
	Sector Alamo 
	Sector Arzuaga 
	Sector Bruseles 
	Sector Cachete 
	Sector Capilla
	Sector Carmelo Dávila 
	Sector Cuatro Calles 
	Sector Gómez 
	Sector Jardines de San Joaquín 
	Sector Los Agosto 
	Sector Los Dávila 
	Sector Méndez Sector Bezares 
	Sector Rojas 
	Sector Santa 
	Sector Serrano 
	Sector Valles de San Joaquín 
	Sector Valles de San Lorenzo 
	Sector Vázquez 
	Sector Vistas de Quebrada 
	Urbanización Haciendas Parque de San Lorenzo 
	Urbanización Sabanera del Río
	Urbanización Savannah Real 
	Urbanización Valles de Quebrada 
	Urbanización Villas de Quebrada

Quebrada Arenas

	Camino Pellín Claudio 
	Sector Acueducto 
	Sector Blanca Blanco
	Sector Cáez o Santana
	Sector Carmelo Figueroa 
	Sector Cayo Félix 
	Sector Cruz Gómez 
	Sector Gerardo Villafañe 
	Sector Jacobo Pérez 
	Sector Lencho Flores 
	Sector Lorenzo del Valle 
	Sector Los Gómez 
	Sector Los Guábaros 
	Sector María Hernández 
	Sector Miguel Angel Aponte 
	Sector Ortiz 
	Sector Río Playita o Sector Capilla 
	Sector Ventura Martínez

Quebrada Honda

	Camino Pedro Serrano
	Sector Arroyo
	Sector Capilla o Parroquia
	Sector Cubuy, Sector Huertas
	Sector Gallera
	Sector García 
	Sector La Loma
	Sector López
	Sector Mojica
	Sector Pia Colón
	Sector Puerto Moyett
	Sector Rodríguez
	Sector Vicéns

Quemados

	Camino Eliasim López 
	Camino Juan Flores 
	Camino Julio Morales 
	Camino Loma Linda 
	Comunidad Sunny Hills
	Sector Brisas del Monte 
	Sector Buenos Aires 
	Sector Cáez 
	Sector Capilla 
	Sector Carlos Flores 
	Sector Carrasco 
	Sector Cruces 
	Sector Final 
	Sector Las Colinas 
	Sector Los Adorno 
	Sector Muñoz 
	Sector Neris 
	Sector Pachín 
	Sector Pané 
	Sector Parcelas Quemados 
	Sector Quemado Arriba 
	Sector Roldán 
	Sector Salvatierra 
	Sector Santiago
	Sector Valles de Oasis  
	Sector Vicente Pedraza 
	Sector Vista San Felipe
	Urbanización Las Colinas 
	Urbanización Monte Verde 
	Urbanización Paseos de San Lorenzo 
	Urbanización Salvatierra

San Lorenzo barrio-pueblo

	Calle Celso Barbosa 
	Calle Colón 
	Calle Condado 
	Calle Delicias 
	Calle Dr. Veve Calzada 
	Calle El Edén 
	Calle Emilio Buitrago 
	Calle Federico Sellés 
	Calle José de Diego 
	Calle Julia Vázquez 
	Calle Méndez Álvarez 
	Calle Muñoz Rivera 
	Calle Nueva 
	Calle Policarpio Santana 
	Calle Ramón Alcalá 
	Calle Sánchez López 
	Calle Santiago Iglesias Pantín
	Calle Soto 
	Calle Tomás Delgado 
	Calle Tous Soto 
	Calle Valeriano Muñoz 
	España 
	Residencial Hato Grande 
	Reparto Medina 
	Sector Aril
	Sector Asia
	Urbanización Las Mercedes 
	Urbanización Massó 
	Urbanización San Miguel 
	Urbanización y Extensión Jardines de San Lorenzo

See also

 List of communities in Puerto Rico

References

San Lorenzo
San Lorenzo